This list of notable Howard University Alumni, sometimes known as Bison, includes faculty, staff, graduates, honorary graduates, non-graduate former students and current students of the American Howard University, a private, coeducational, nonsectarian historically black university, located in Washington, D.C.

Academics

Science, medicine and mathematics

Historians

Academic administrators

Business

Politics and public service

Civil rights, law, and government

Military service

Entertainment

Sports

Journalism

Nobel laureates 

Peace, literature, or economics

Literature

Musicians

Pageant queens

Film and television

Other visual and performing arts

Religion

Other notable alumni

Notable faculty

See also 

 List of people from Washington, D.C.

References 

 
 
Howard University people
Lists of people by educational affiliation in Washington, D.C.